Modoc County is a county in the far northeast corner of the U.S. state of California. Its population is 8,700 as of the 2020 census, down from 9,686 from the 2010 census. This makes it California's third-least populous county. The county seat and only incorporated city is Alturas. Previous county seats include Lake City and Centerville. The county borders Nevada and Oregon.

Much of Modoc County is federal land. Several federal agencies, including the United States Forest Service, Bureau of Land Management, National Park Service, Bureau of Indian Affairs, and the United States Fish and Wildlife Service, have employees assigned to the area, and their operations are a significant part of its economy and services.

The county's official slogans include "The last best place" and "Where the West still lives".

History
Prior to the arrival of Europeans in the region, varying cultures of Native Americans inhabited the county for thousands of years. At the time of European encounter, the Modoc people lived in what is now northern California, near Lost River and Tule Lake. The county was named after them. The Achomawi (or Pit River Indians, for which the Pit River is named), and the Paiute also lived in the area. To the north were the Klamath in present-day Oregon.

The first European explorers to visit Modoc County were the American John C. Frémont and his traveling party (including Kit Carson) in 1846, who had departed from Sutter's Fort near the confluence of the American and Sacramento Rivers (where Sacramento stands today).

The northern boundary of California, and eventually Modoc County, had been established as the 42nd parallel since the time of Mexican possession. In the absence of a reliable survey of the 120th meridian, the eastern boundary of northern California was a subject of contention before Modoc County formed. The Territory of Utah requested jurisdiction to the summit of the Sierra Nevada. At the time, the Warner Mountains were believed to be a part of the Sierra Nevada, so this would have included Surprise Valley, but California denied the request.

In 1856, the residents of Honey Lake Valley reckoned the 120th meridian to be west of their valley, placing them in Utah territory, and attempted to secede and form a territory they called Nataqua. Nataqua would have included Modoc County. In 1858, the Territory of Nevada, with its capital now in Carson City, seceded from Utah, and assumed jurisdiction to the summit of the Sierra Nevada until the 120th meridian was surveyed in 1863.

After Nevada was granted statehood in 1864, the region of current Modoc County was placed within jurisdiction of Shasta County, California, and Siskiyou County was, in turn, generated from Shasta County in 1852.

Increasing traffic on the emigrant trail, unprovoked militia raids on innocent Modoc, and a cycle of retaliatory raids increased a cycle of violence between settlers and the tribes in the area. In 1864, the Klamath, Modoc and Yahooskin band of the Shoshone signed a treaty ceding lands in both Oregon and California, and the tribes were colocated on the Klamath Reservation. Harassed by the Klamath, traditional competitors, a band of Modoc led by Captain Jack returned to California and the Tule Lake area.

The Modoc War or Lava Beds War of 1872-73 brought nationwide attention to the Modoc. From strong defensive positions in the lava tubes, 52 Modoc warriors held off hundreds of US Army forces, who called in artillery to help. Peace talks in 1873 stalled when the Modoc wanted their own reservation in California. Warriors urged killing the peace commissioners, thinking the Americans would then leave, and Captain Jack and others shot and killed General Edward Canby and Rev. Eleazer Thomas, as well as wounding others. More Army troops were called in to lay siege to Captain Jack's Stronghold. Dissension arose, and some Modoc surrendered. Finally, most were captured, and those responsible for the assassinations were tried and executed. More than 150 Modoc were transported to Indian Territory as prisoners of war. The area has since been designated the Lava Beds National Monument.

Settlement of the county began in earnest in the 1870s, with the timber, gold, agriculture, and railroad industries bringing most of the settlers into the area. The county was a crossroads for the Lassen Applegate Trail, which brought settlers north from Nevada to the Oregon Trail and south to trails leading into California's central valley. Early settlers included the Dorris, Belli, Essex, Scherer, Trumbo, Flournoy, Polander, Rice and Campbell families.

Modoc County was formed when Governor Newton Booth signed an Act of the California Legislature on February 17, 1874, after residents of the Surprise Valley region lobbied for the creation of a new county from eastern Siskiyou County land. The county residents considered naming the newly formed county after Canby, whom the Modoc had killed the previous year in an ambush at peace talks. The name Summit was also considered, but the populace eventually settled on Modoc. The war was over and 153 of Captain Jack's band had been transported to Indian Territory as prisoners.

The Dorris Bridge post office opened in 1871 and was renamed Dorrisville in 1874. Due to its central location, it became the county seat when Modoc County formed that year, although both Adin and Cedarville were larger towns. In 1876, it was renamed Alturas, Spanish for "The Heights". The 1880 census showed a population of 148. Settlement continued for the next 20 years, until the city was officially incorporated on September 16, 1901 (the county's only incorporated city).

During World War II, the US government developed several thousand acres just south of Newell as a Japanese American internment camp. Tule Lake War Relocation Center was the site of temporary exile for thousands of Japanese-American citizens, who lost most of their businesses and properties where they had formerly lived in coastal areas. A historical marker marks the site along California State Route 139 in Newell.

Tule Lake was the largest of the "segregation camps." On November 8, 2005, Senator Dianne Feinstein called for the camp to be designated a National Historic Landmark. In December 2008 President George W. Bush designated it one of nine sites to be part of the new World War II Valor in the Pacific National Monument, now the Tule Lake National Monument.

Geography

There are 2.25 persons per square mile, making this one of the most sparsely populated counties in California. It is also (almost) the only rectangular county in California; there is a slight deviation around the Tule Lake National Wildlife Refuge.

The county is very diverse geographically.  The northwestern edge of the county is dominated by the Medicine Lake Highlands, the largest shield volcano on the U.S. West Coast. The Lava Beds National Monument lies partly within the northwest corner of the county.  Also along the western edge of the county is the massive Glass Mountain lava flow.  The southwestern corner of the county is a unique ecosystem of isolated hardwoods (oaks) and volcanic mountains with intermountain river valleys.

Nearly 1 million acres (4,000 km2) of the Modoc National Forest lie on the plateau between the Medicine Lake Highlands in the west and the Warner Mountains in the east. The plateau supports large herds of mule deer (Odocoileus hemionus), Rocky Mountain Elk (Cervus canadensis), and pronghorn (Antilocapra americana). There are also several herds of wild horses on the plateau. The Clear Lake National Wildlife Refuge and Long Bell State Game Refuge are located on the plateau as well. The Lost River watershed, which later drains into the Klamath River basin, drains the north part of the plateau, while southern watersheds either collect in basin reservoirs or flow into the large Big Sage Reservoir, which sits in the center of the county, which later flows into the Pit River.

Below the rim of the Plateau is Big Valley in the extreme southwest corner of the county, and the large Warm Springs Valley that forms the bottom of the Pit River watershed that runs through the county.  The north fork and south fork of the Pit River come together just south of Alturas.  The River collects hundreds of other small creeks as it flows south towards Lake Shasta, where it joins the Sacramento River and drains into the San Francisco Bay.

The eastern edge of the county is dominated by the Warner Mountains.  The Pit River originates in this mountain range.  Hundreds of alpine lakes dot the range, all of which are fed by snow-melt and natural springs.  East of the Warner Range is Surprise Valley and the western edge of the Great Basin.

Hot Springs and lava caves are common to Modoc County.  There are some geothermal energy resources available in the county, though their viability is highly variable.  

A great diversity of plants are found in Modoc County, since this is situated within the biodiverse California Floristic Province. Numerous native trees are found in the county including Garry Oak and Washoe Pine trees. Jeffrey Pine and Ponderosa Pine are also found in large numbers.

Adjacent counties
Klamath County, Oregon - north
Lake County, Oregon - north
Washoe County, Nevada - east
Lassen County - south
Shasta County - southwest
Siskiyou County - west

National protected areas
 Clear Lake National Wildlife Refuge
 Lava Beds National Monument (part)
 Modoc National Forest (part)
 Shasta National Forest (part)
 Modoc National Wildlife Refuge (part)
 Tule Lake National Wildlife Refuge (part)
 Tule Lake Unit, World War II Valor in the Pacific National Monument (part)

Demographics

2011

Places by population, race, and income

2000

As of the census of 2000, there were 9,449 people, 3,784 households, and 2,550 families residing in the county. The population density was 2 people per square mile (1/km2). There were 4,807 housing units at an average density of 1 per square mile (0/km2). The racial makeup of the county was 85.9% White, 0.7% Black or African American, 4.2% American Indian, 0.6% Asian, 0.1% Pacific Islander, 5.7% from other races, and 2.8% from two or more races. 11.5% of the population were Hispanic or Latino of any race.

The largest ethnicity/ancestry groups in Modoc county include: 15% English, 14% Irish and 13% German of whom 90.4% spoke English and 8.8% Spanish as their first language.

There were 3,784 households, out of which 29.1% had children under the age of 18 living with them, 54.6% were married couples living together, 8.8% had a female householder with no husband present, and 32.6% were non-families. 28.1% of all households were made up of individuals, and 12.7% had someone living alone who was 65 years of age or older. The average household size was 2.39 and the average family size was 2.91.

In the county, the population was spread out, with 25.6% under the age of 18, 5.7% from 18 to 24, 23.3% from 25 to 44, 27.7% from 45 to 64, and 17.6% who were 65 years of age or older. The median age was 42 years. For every 100 females, there were 102.4 males. For every 100 females age 18 and over, there were 98.7 males.

The median income for a household in the county was $27,522, and the median income for a family was $35,978. Males had a median income of $30,538 versus $23,438 for females. The per capita income for the county was $17,285. About 16.4% of families and 21.5% of the population were below the poverty line, including 29.7% of those under age 18 and 8.6% of those age 65 or over.

Modoc County has the lowest median household income of any county in California.

In 2005, the median home price reached $100,000 for the first time ever, over a 40% increase since 2000. Much of this can be traced to an influx of residents from other parts of the state, who find the housing bargains attractive. Some of these are retirees who have sold their houses for large profits in other parts of the state, using the proceeds to live on, while others are remote workers. This sudden rise in housing prices become unaffordable for locals, who find themselves unable to purchase homes given their limited incomes.

2010
The 2010 United States Census reported that Modoc County had a population of 9,686. The racial makeup of Modoc County was 8,084 (83.5%) White, 82 (0.8%) African American, 370 (3.8%) Native American, 78 (0.8%) Asian, 21 (0.2%) Pacific Islander, 680 (7.0%) from other races, and 371 (3.8%) from two or more races. Hispanic or Latino of any race were 1,342 persons (13.9%).

Politics

For much of the 20th century, Modoc County was a bellwether county for statewide elections in California, voting for the statewide winner in every election between 1912 and 1990 with the exception of Jerry Brown's two statewide victories (the county's dislike of Brown attributable to his environmental policies negatively affecting the county's logging industry).

Recently, though, Modoc County has trended Republican, becoming one of the most conservative counties in the state. On November 4, 2008, Modoc County delivered the most lopsided vote in favor of John McCain of any county in California, with 67.4% of voters opting for the Republican.  The county also voted 74.2% in favor of Proposition 8 which amended the California Constitution to ban same-sex marriages; only Kern and Tulare counties voted in higher proportion, both opting for the Proposition with 75.4% of the vote. In the 2021 California gubernatorial recall election, Modoc and neighboring Lassen County voted most strongly in favor of recalling Newsom of any counties in the state.

On September 24, 2013, the Modoc County Board of Supervisors voted 4–0 in favor of secession from California to form a proposed state named Jefferson.

Voter registration

Cities by population and voter registration

Historical election results

Crime 

The following table includes the number of incidents reported and the rate per 1,000 persons for each type of offense:

Cities by population and crime rates

Transportation

Major highways
 U.S. Route 395
 State Route 139
 State Route 299

Additionally, the eastern Modoc County communities of Eagleville, Cedarville, Lake City, and Fort Bidwell are connected via Surprise Valley Road, which runs from the southern county line to the Oregon border.

Public transportation
The Sage Stage is a dial-a-ride service providing trips within Modoc County. It has also provided trips as far away as Klamath Falls, Oregon, and Reno, Nevada.

Airports
There are general aviation airports near Alturas (Alturas Municipal Airport and California Pines Airport). Other airports include Cedarville Airport, Eagleville Airport, Fort Bidwell Airport, and Tulelake Municipal Airport.

Communities

City
Alturas (county seat)

Census-designated places

Adin
California Pines
Canby
Cedarville
Daphnedale Park
Eagleville
Fort Bidwell
Lake City
Likely
Lookout
Newell
New Pine Creek

Other unincorporated places
Davis Creek
Tionesta

Population ranking
The population ranking of the following table is based on the 2020 census of Modoc County.

† county seat

See also 
 Modoc County Historical Museum
 List of school districts in Modoc County, California
 National Register of Historic Places listings in Modoc County, California

Notes

References

External links

 
 Hiking trails in Modoc County
 h2g2 Guide Entry A1065278: Modoc County, California, USA
 OpenRoad.TV (Modoc County's Living West video story)

 
California counties
California placenames of Native American origin
Shasta Cascade
1874 establishments in California
Populated places established in 1874